Gać is a village in the administrative district of Gmina Słupsk, within Słupsk County, Pomeranian Voivodeship, in northern Poland.

The village has a population of 149.

Notable residents
Gustav von Below (1790–1843)

References

Villages in Słupsk County